USA-MMA is a mixed martial arts (MMA) organization based in the United States that was created in 2007 by Gil Guillory, a twenty-year veteran of Mixed Martial Arts. USA-MMA features up and coming MMA stars and veterans based in and around Louisiana. They adhere to the North American Unified Rules of MMA. USA-MMA also has both amateur and professional rankings and titles, but there are no formal declarations of what qualifications a fighter must have to turn pro by the organization.

USA-MMA XIV, Return of the Champions, will feature two UFC World Heavyweight Champions.  Ricco Rodriguez will be in the co-main event and the "world's most dangerous man", Ken Shamrock, will make his USA-MMA debut.  This event is being held at The Cajundome in Lafayette, Louisiana.

Final Champions

 Lightweight (155 lb.) Amateur Champion :
Paul Hebbler, Gladiator, Baton Rouge, Louisiana

 Middleweight (185 lb.) Amateur Champion :
Jeff Wuenschel, Cajun Karate, Lafayette, Louisiana

 Middleweight (185 lb.) Professional Champion :
Charlie Rader, Gracie Barra, Southshore

 Light Heavyweight (205 lb.) Professional Champion :
Roman Pizzolato, Gracie Barra, Baton Rouge, Louisiana

STRIKE 

Starting with USA-MMA 6: Night of Champions, USA-MMA has started a new strain of Mixed Martial Arts called STRIKE. Fought in a normal sized cage, STRIKE competitors are allowed to use punches, kicks, elbows, and knees, but are not allowed to clinch, go for a takedown, or use any wrestling skills. This new division is patterned after the world-famous K-1 organization, with a few subtle changes.  STRIKE is developed to give boxers, kickboxers and other striking sports an opportunity to participate in more events.  STRIKE also allows these participants, of striking sports, to transition into MMA.  USA-MMA could possibly make this another division but currently fighters are allowed to move back and forth between STRIKE and normal MMA.

List of shows

References

External links 
 

Mixed martial arts organizations